The Black Market Concierge is a 2016 American book written by former professional rugby player and intelligence operative Barry Oberholzer. The book is about Barry Oberholzer's secret life as a confidential informant for the CIA and other intelligence agencies. It has become the first book in which the NFT project of a TV series has been made.

Plot 
The Black Market Concierge takes readers inside the counter intelligence world, showing the daily life of zealous men set on greed, extortion and power.

Since his sanction-breaking activities made headlines in 2012, the South African government has attempted to politically prosecute Oberholzer on multiple fronts, all while international smuggling cartels were on the hunt for him. The book provides a tantalizing look at his dangerous life as an undercover confidential informant, as Oberholzer traveled the world for missions targeting its most dangerous cartels, smugglers and corrupts politicians and gives insight into the world's most powerful intelligence agencies.

NFT Project 
The Black Market Concierge is being adapted into a television series as NFT project. NFT copies of the book will be treated as a limited edition version of the show

References 

2016 non-fiction books
American non-fiction books
Non-fiction books about the Central Intelligence Agency